This is a list of main career statistics of Croatian professional tennis player Borna Ćorić. All statistics are according to the ATP Tour and ITF websites.

Performance timelines 

Only main-draw results in ATP Tour, Grand Slam tournaments, Davis Cup/ATP Cup/United Cup/Laver Cup and Olympic Games are included in win–loss records.

Singles

Current through the 2023 BNP Paribas Open.

Doubles

Significant finals

ATP Masters 1000 tournaments

Singles: 2 (1 title, 1 runner-up)

ATP career finals

Singles: 8 (3 titles, 5 runner-ups)

ATP Challengers and ITF Futures finals

Singles: 9 (8 titles, 1 runner-up)

Doubles: 2 (2 runner-ups)

Junior Grand Slam finals

Singles: 1 (1 title)

Best Grand Slam results details

Record against other players

Record against top-10 players

Ćorić's record against those who have been ranked in the top 10, with active players in boldface:

Wins over top 10 players
Ćorić has a  record against players who were, at the time the match was played, ranked in the top 10.

Notes

References

External links

Ćorić, Borna